Sumprabum Township is a township of Putao District in the Kachin State of Burma. The principal town is Sumprabum.

Townships of Kachin State